Plexippus baro is a jumping spider species in the genus Plexippus that lives in Ethiopia. The male was first described in 2008.

References

Endemic fauna of Ethiopia
Fauna of Ethiopia
Salticidae
Spiders of Africa
Spiders described in 2008
Taxa named by Wanda Wesołowska